The Remington Model 341 is a bolt-action rifle designed and built by Remington Arms for four years prior to World War II.

Design
The Model 341 is a conventional bolt-action, tube fed rifle. It is, in essence, an updated Model 34.  Though conventional in layout and design, the Model 34 and 341 feature a patented lifter mechanism that presents cartridges to the chamber without the bullet touching rear of the chamber. This prevents damage to the bullet and conceivably increases accuracy potential.

External links

 
 
 

Remington Arms firearms
Bolt-action rifles of the United States